Mika'ela Fisher (born 25 February 1975 in Bavaria, Germany), also known as Mika'Ela Fisher or Mikaela Fisher (the correct spelling of the first name is with an apostrophe ), is a German film director, writer, producer, actress, model, and master tailor.     
She gained recognition as an actor for her role in the movie Tell No One (Ne le dis à personne). In 2013 she produced and directed her first short film, Die Tapferen Haende im Chaos der Zeit.

Biography

Fashion

Fisher has worked for the bespoke tailoring house Max Dietl in Munich, having obtained her master's degree as a bespoke tailor. She showcased her work at the world master tailors' convention in Paris (Congrès Mondial des Maitres Tailleurs).
She poses as a model for French painters Boussignac and Hubert de Lartigue; and modeled for many years for the fashion houses Martin Margiela, Hermès, John Galliano, Gilles Rosier, Undercover, Eley Kishimoto, among others.

Film
After years in the fashion world, she tried her hand in acting, following the acting courses of Jack Waltzer and John Strasberg. Fisher's portrayal of Zak, a ruthless killer in Guillaume Canet's Tell No One, was critically acclaimed, especially in the U.S. media.

She started directing in 2013 by the biographical short film Die Tapferen Haende im Chaos der Zeit (Valiant Hands in the Chaos of Time), for which she is both director, producer and costume designer.
This film has been selected at several festivals (Columbus International Film and Video Festival Maverick Movie Awards, Indie Fest, Revelation Perth International Film Festival,...)  and was honored with awards in categories such as best director, Best Short Film, best soundtrack, Best of Art, Best Costume Design .
Victory's Short, her second short film as a director and producer, was nominated at the Milan International Film Festival (MIFF Awards 2015).
In her third film Männin, inspired by Martin Luther's Bible, she plays the dual role of Adam and Eve.

Her short movies started a theatrical run on 7 January 2015 and a second time on 16 December 2015 in France.

In the feature documentary L'architecte textile (2017)  about sartorial art, she filmed herself while she was making a three-piece suit. As an official selection at the Newport Beach Film Festival 2018 the film was presented at Art Architecture Design program  . In Poland at On Art Film Festival 2018 L'architecte textile was honored with the On Art Award (First place – Long Independent). The film was part of the XIIth Florence Biennale.
Elevated Perspective – Haute Mesure (2018) is a very short sketch comedy film, which was produced for the InterContinental Hotel, Los Angeles Downtown.

Her first feature film debut, Die Höhenluft – für Alle und Keinen (Pure Air of the Mountain – for All and None) has been selected at the Hof International Film Festival 2021. 
  

Fisher is a member of Women in Film and Television and the Maison des Artistes in Paris.

Her sartorial-sculptural conceptual artworks are represented by the gallery Kunsthaus 7B.

Filmography as an actress
 2005: Home Cinema by Philippe Fernandez and Mika'ela Fisher: herself
 2006: Tell No One by Guillaume Canet: Zak
 2006: Everyone Is Beautiful John Galliano Show by Nick Knight: Lady Tango Dancer
 2006: Retour au pays de Merzak Allouache: the artist
 2007: La promenade by Marina de Van: Prostitute no. 2
 2008: Lisa  by Lorenzo Recio: the mother
 2008: Anything for Her by Fred Cavayé: tattooed woman
 2009: The Lost Door by Roy Stuart: Kristina
 2010: Image particulière by Kevin Sean Michaels: Sophie
 2011: Boro in the Box by Bertrand Mandico: Ligia
 2011: Out of Fashion: Maison Martin Margiela by Martin Margiela: Model
 2012: The Naked Leading the Blind  by Wim Vanacker: Martha
 2013:  Star Meter: Cataracte (Video Art) by Mika'Ela Fisher / Philippe Deutsch: Cataract
 2013: Colt 45  by Fabrice Du Welz: Mika
 2013: Die Tapferen Haende im Chaos der Zeit by Mika Ela Fisher: model
 2014: Victory's Short by Mika'Ela Fisher: Gabrielle Montvignier
 2014: Entre vents et marées by Josée Dayan: Katarina

 2015: Männin  by Mika'Ela Fisher: Adam / Eva / Männin
 2015: The Artist Is Absent: A Short Film on Martin Margiela by Alison Chernick: model
 2017: Odile dans la vallée by Bertrand Mandico and Elina Löwensohn: Odile
 2017: The Women Collection by Claudio Duarte: Karl Lagerfeld
 2017: L'architecte textile by Mika'Ela Fisher: Maître Tailleur
 2018 : Elevated Perspective – Haute Mesure by Mika'Ela Fisher : Maître Tailleur / Mannequin 
 2020 : Un ange au bord de l'océan by Anne Amiand : L'ange 
 2021 : Die Höhenluft – für Alle und Keinen by Mika'Ela Fisher: Angra M.

Filmography as a director

Awards and nominations

Awards

 2020 Best Opera Prima Film at ARTE Non Stop Film Festival for L'architecte textile 
 2020 Festival Prize Best Opera Prima Director at ARTE Non Stop Film Festival for L'architecte textile
 2018: On Art Award (First place-Long independent) at On Art Film Festival for L'architecte textile 
 2015: Award of Merit (Women Filmmakers) at Accolade Global Film Competition for Männin
 2015: Award of Merit (Costume Design) at Indie Fest for Die Tapferen Haende im Chaos der Zeit
 2015: Award of Merit (Film Short) at Accolade Global Film Competition for Die Tapferen Haende im Chaos der Zeit
 2014: Silver Chris Award (Best of Arts) at Columbus International Film and Video Festival for Die Tapferen Haende im Chaos der Zeit
 2012: Best supporting actress at American International Film Festival for The Naked Leading the Blind.

Nominations
 2019: Film Art Award (Design – Art) at Florence Biennale for L'architecte textile 
 2019: Jury Award (Fashion Feature Film) at Sonoma International Film Festival for L'architecte textile 
 2018: Documentary Award (Art, Architecture & Design) at Newport Beach Film Festival for L'architecte textile 
 2018: Best short film (vertical movie) at Linea d'Ombra Festival for Elevated Perspective – Haute Mesure 
 2015: Best short film at the American Psychological Association APA Film Festival for Männin
 2015: Best short film at Milan International Film Festival Awards for Victory's Short
 2013: Best director at Maverick Movie Awards for Die Tapferen Haende im Chaos der Zeit
 2013: Best actress at Northwest Ohio Independent Film Festival for The Naked Leading the Blind
 2012: Best supporting actress at Maverick Movie Awards for The Naked Leading the Blind

References

External links

 Official website of Mika'ela Fisher
 Mika'ela Fisher – Master Tailor
 Reviews of Mika'ela Fisher – Tell No One
  Chrysopras Films
 Homepage von Fisher - La Maison des Artistes Paris
 
 Auteur Bibliothèque Nationale de France

Reviews 
 PopMatters – The 20 Top Female Performances of 2008 at popmatters

Living people
German female models
German film actresses
Film people from Munich
German women film directors
Actresses from Munich
German tailors
German artists
1975 births